The 39th Infantry Division (39-ya Pekhotnaya Diviziya) was an infantry formation of the Russian Imperial Army.

Organization
1st Brigade
153rd Infantry Regiment
154th Infantry Regiment
2nd Brigade
155th Infantry Regiment
156th Infantry Regiment
39th Artillery Brigade

Commanders
1896-1899: Ivan Fullon

Chiefs of Staff
1890-1891: Alexander Iosafovich Ievreinov

Commanders of the 1st Brigade
September 1908-1913: Konstantin Lukich Gilchevsky

References

Infantry divisions of the Russian Empire
Military units and formations disestablished in 1918